Submarino is a 2010 Danish drama film directed by Thomas Vinterberg, starring Jakob Cedergren and Peter Plaugborg. It is based on the 2007 novel Submarino by Jonas T. Bengtsson, and focuses on two brothers on the bottom of Danish society, with lives marked by violence and drug addiction. The film was produced by Nimbus Film. As a condition from the financier TV 2, half of the cast and crew were novices, which the director enjoyed as it gave an experience similar to his earliest films.

Submarino premiered in the main competition of the 60th Berlin International Film Festival. The film won the 2010 Nordic Council Film Prize. It was met by positive reviews in Denmark and has been nominated for 15 Robert Awards.

Plot
The story of two brothers who lose track of each other after an unstable childhood until they meet up again in prison is the focus of former Dogme 95 director Thomas Vinterberg’s film based on a book by Jonas T. Bengtsson, a Danish novelist celebrated for his unflinching realism. The film’s title refers to a method of torture known as ‘submarino’ in which the victim's head is held under water until just before the point of drowning.

Nick and his younger brother have grown up in terrible circumstances: their childhood was marked by poverty, abuse and an alcoholic mother until the family was torn apart by tragedy. Nick is now thirty-three and has just been released from prison. He’s a man who knows what he wants: to train hard and drink hard in order to stand up against a hard world. A bodybuilder, he lives in a dilapidated hostel on the outskirts of Copenhagen. His brother is a junkie, a heroin dealer, and a single father for whom only two things count in life: his daily fix and a better life for his six-year-old son, Martin.

The brothers may live separate lives in grim Copenhagen, yet they are somehow searching for each other. What binds them is their mutual struggle for a life worth living. Occasionally their paths cross, but they only really find each other in prison. And that’s almost too late for them.

Cast
 Jakob Cedergren as Nick
 Peter Plaugborg as Nick's brother
 Patricia Schumann as Sofie
 Morten Rose as Ivan
 Gustav Fischer Kjærulff as Martin
 Henrik Strube as Jimmy Gule
 Helene Reingaard Neumann as Mona
 Sebastian Bull Sarning as young Nick
 Mads Broe Andersen as young Nick's brother

Production
In June 2008 it was announced that Thomas Vinterberg would adapt Jonas T. Bengtsson's novel which had been well received by the Danish media the year before. Submarino was launched as one of four films on which Nimbus Film would spend the 1.4 million kroner they recently had been granted from the European Union's MEDIA Programme. The film was made without support from the Danish Film Institute. Instead it received public funding through the broadcaster TV 2, whose condition for providing the money was that half of the cast and production crew would be first-timers. 
Vinterberg thought the condition helped the film's authenticity and likened the experience to his very earliest works: "That eagerness, energy, whole-hearted devotion from people starting a career was amazing. I had been missing this from when I did my graduation film at the Danish Film School, prior to Dogma. I enjoyed that." Feature-film debutants included the cinematographer Charlotte Bruus Christensen, the scriptwriter Tobias Lindholm and the stage actor Peter Plaugborg who played Nick's brother. The budget was around 1.8 million euro.

Reception

Critical response
Ebbe Iversen rated Submarino four out of six in Berlingske Tidende. Iversen wrote that Vinterberg has "shaped his film as fierce social realism almost totally exposed for the glimpses of humour that make a miserable life easier to bear in leading social realists like Ken Loach and Mike Leigh. Submarino is harder and more brutal, but, behind its harsh facade, carried by sympathy for the characters, and it is first and foremost created with a completely fearsome consistency, which one hasn't seen the like of in Thomas Vinterberg since The Celebration." Peter Nielsen of Information was even more positive. He thought the story and subject by themselves were strong enough to make an excellent film, and continued: "but what elevates Submarino into a great work of art, is the symbolic redemption of the serious material. You see it in the ritual opening scene, and you see it several times underway in a tight symbology, which escorts and underpins the story." The film failed to reach a large audience during the theatrical run and had only 46,000 admissions in Denmark.

Accolades
Submarino was Denmark's candidate for the 2010 Nordic Council Film Prize, which it won. Jakob Cedergren was nominated for the Best Actor prize at the 23rd European Film Awards. On the national level, the film was nominated for 15 Robert Awards, voted by members of the Film Academy of Denmark, and four Bodil Awards, voted by domestic film critics.

References

External links 
  
 
 

2010 films
2010 drama films
Danish drama films
Films about alcoholism
Films about heroin addiction
Films set in Copenhagen
Films shot in Denmark
Films based on Danish novels
Films directed by Thomas Vinterberg
2010s Danish-language films
Nimbus Film films
Films with screenplays by Tobias Lindholm